Robert C. Brown is an American engineer, currently the Anson Marston Distinguished Professor in Engineering and the Gary and Donna Hoover Chair in Mechanical Engineering at Iowa State University.

References

Year of birth missing (living people)
Living people
Iowa State University faculty
21st-century American engineers
Michigan State University alumni
University of Missouri alumni